John Farquharson McIntosh (1846-1918) was a Scottish engineer.  He was Chief Mechanical Engineer of the Caledonian Railway from 1895 to 1914. He was succeeded by William Pickersgill.

Early life

Born in Farnell, Angus, Scotland, in February 1846, MacIntosh would be famous for working at St. Rollox railway works, in Springburn, in Glasgow.

Career

John F. McIntosh became an apprentice with the Scottish North Eastern Railway, at the Arbroath workshops, at the age of 14. In 1865 he passed out as a fireman and in 1867 he qualified as a driver and moved to Montrose. By this time he was employed by the Caledonian Railway (CR) which had taken over the SNER in 1866. He lost his right hand in an accident in 1876 or 1877. At about the same time he became Locomotive Inspector for the northern section of the CR. He was later given responsibility for all locations north of Greenhill. By 1881 he was living in Perth. Several appointments followed –  Locomotive Foreman at Aberdeen, Carstairs and Polmadie (Glasgow); Chief Inspector; Locomotive Running Superintendent and deputy to John Lambie.
Lambie died suddenly on 1 February 1895 and McIntosh replaced him as Chief Mechanical Engineer.

Locomotive designs

McIntosh's most famous design is the Dunalastair Class 4-4-0. Other designs include:
Caledonian Railway 19, 92 and 439 classes 0-4-4T (2P)
Caledonian Railway 498 Class 0-6-0T
Caledonian Railway 29 & 782 classes 0-6-0T (3F)
Caledonian Railway 498 Class 0-6-0T (2F)
Caledonian Railway 104 Class 0-4-4T
Caledonian Railway 781 Class 0-4-0T
Caledonian Railway 492 Class 0-8-0T
Caledonian Railway 600 Class 0-8-0
Caledonian Railway 652 and 812 classes 0-6-0 (3F)
Caledonian Railway 611 class 0-4-0T
Caledonian Railway 711 Class 0-6-0
Caledonian Railway Class 30 0-6-0
Caledonian Railway Class 34 2-6-0
Caledonian Railway 721 Class 4-4-0 Dunalastair I
Caledonian Railway 766 Class 4-4-0 Dunalastair II
Caledonian Railway 900 Class 4-4-0 Dunalastair III 
Caledonian Railway 140 Class 4-4-0 Dunalastair IV
Caledonian Railway 139 Class 4-4-0
Caledonian Railway 43 Class 4-4-0
Caledonian Railway 55 Class 4-6-0
Caledonian Railway 908 Class 4-6-0
Caledonian Railway 49 Class 4-6-0
Caledonian Railway 903 Class 4-6-0
Caledonian Railway 918 Class 4-6-0
Caledonian Railway 179 Class 4-6-0
Caledonian Railway 184 Class 4-6-0

Preservation
Two McIntosh locomotives are preserved:
 439 Class, number 419 at the Bo'ness and Kinneil Railway
 812 Class, number 828 at the Strathspey Railway

Patents

He obtained patents for a spark arrestor and a gauge glass protector.

List of patents
 GB189823849 (with Archibald St Clair Ruthven), published 31 May 1899, Improvements in or relating to railway wagon brakes
 GB190004019 (with Archibald St Clair Ruthven), published 16 February 1901, Improvements in or relating to railway wagon brakes        
 GB190207009 (with John Riekie), published 22 April 1903, Improvements in and connected with engine valve gear
 GB190822998 (with Walter Reuben Preston), published 28 October 1909, Improvements in or relating to the smoke boxes of locomotive boilers

Family
He married Jeanie Fleming Logan, a close relative to author Ian Fleming, and they had 3 sons and 4 daughters.

Death

McIntosh died suddenly while working at St. Rollox railway works, on 6 February 1918, 22 days before his 72nd birthday. The cause of death was never confirmed.

See also
 Locomotives of the Caledonian Railway
 Locomotives of the London, Midland and Scottish Railway

References

1846 births
1918 deaths
Locomotive builders and designers
Scottish railway mechanical engineers
British railway pioneers
Scottish mechanical engineers
Caledonian Railway people
19th-century British businesspeople